Daniel Pavlev (born 11 October 2000) is a Slovenian footballer who plays as a defender for Italian  club Viterbese.

Club career
He was raised in the youth teams of Chievo and started playing for their Under-19 squad in the 2016–17 season. He began receiving call-ups to the senior squad in the summer of 2019.

He made his Serie B debut for Chievo on 26 September 2020 in a game against Pescara. He substituted Luca Palmiero in the 89th minute.

On 10 August 2021, he signed a two-year contract with Viterbese.

References

External links
 

2000 births
Living people
People from Šempeter pri Gorici
Slovenian footballers
Association football defenders
Serie B players
Serie C players
A.C. ChievoVerona players
U.S. Viterbese 1908 players
Slovenian expatriate footballers
Slovenian expatriate sportspeople in Italy
Expatriate footballers in Italy
Slovenia youth international footballers